Asthena anseraria is a moth of the family Geometridae. It is known from most of Europe (except Great Britain, Ireland, the Iberian Peninsula, part of the Balkan Peninsula, Norway, Sweden and northern Russia), east to Korea.

The wingspan is about 18 mm. Adults are on wing from May to July in two generations per year.

The larvae feed on Cornus sanguinea. Larvae can be found in June and August. Larvae that live on green leaves are green and larvae that live on red leaves are red. It overwinters as a pupa.

Subspecies
Asthena anseraria anseraria (Palaearctic)
Asthena anseraria corculina Butler, 1878 (Japan, China)
Asthena anseraria lactularia (Herrich-Schäffer, 1855)

References

External links

Lepiforum e.V.
Insektenbox.de

Moths described in 1855
Asthena
Moths of Europe
Moths of Asia
Taxa named by Gottlieb August Wilhelm Herrich-Schäffer